Rio Casino Resort (formerly known as Tusk Rio Casino Resort) is a casino and resort in Klerksdorp, Dr Kenneth Kaunda District Municipality in North West (South African province).  At , it is one of the largest casinos in the Southern Hemisphere and the world

History 
Rio Casino Resort was opened in May 2002 as "Tusk Rio Casino Resort". In August 2006, Peermont Global acquired Tusk Resorts, renaming the property as "Rio Casino Resort". The acquisition of the property was made to realize a substantial increase in casino gaming and improve lodging on land where the company held gaming licenses. Shortly thereafter, a new Peermont Metcourt Rio Hotel was built adjacent to the resort along with a new convention center, Peermont's first in the area, with only one other lodging facility offering such conference facilities. It is the largest casino on the African continent at just over 266,000 sq. feet.

See also

 List of hotels in South Africa

References

External links 
 

Casinos in South Africa
Hotels in South Africa
Economy of North West (South African province)
Casino hotels
Hotels established in 2002
Hotel buildings completed in 2002
Dr Kenneth Kaunda District Municipality
2002 establishments in South Africa
21st-century architecture in South Africa